Frank Erwin "Ham" Allen  (April 20, 1846 – February 6, 1881) was an American professional baseball player who played as an outfielder and a shortstop during the 1872 season for the Middletown Mansfields in the National Association.

Allen served as a private in Company F of the 36th Massachusetts Infantry Regiment during the American Civil War.

References

External links

Retrosheet

1846 births
1881 deaths
Major League Baseball outfielders
Major League Baseball shortstops
19th-century baseball players
19th-century baseball umpires
Middletown Mansfields players
Baseball players from Maine
Sportspeople from Augusta, Maine
People from Natick, Massachusetts
Sportspeople from Middlesex County, Massachusetts
Union Army soldiers